Irene Dalton (September 1, 1901 – August 15, 1934) was an American silent film actress. A Chicago native, Irene died at the age of 32.

Biography

Irene Dalton was born on September 10, 1899, in Chicago, Illinois. After graduating from high school she started working as a stenographer. She got her first acting job when she answered an ad in a local newspaper. Dalton came to prominence in motion pictures through her appearances in Christie comedies produced by Charles Christie.

She costarred with Earl Rodney in Three Jokers and with Laura La Plante in His Four Fathers. She was Lloyd Hamilton's leading lady in numerous comedies including The Vagrant, Rolling Stones, and Poor Boy. In 1923 she had a supporting roles in the films Children of Jazz and Bluebeard's 8th Wife.

Dalton had a brief romance with actor Lew Cody. She also had a long affair with wealthy and retired Toledo, Ohio businessman John Raymond Owens, a married millionaire sportsman  the son of Michael Joseph Owens, the millionaire inventor of the Owens Bottle Machine. When his wife filed for divorce she named Irene as the other woman. Owens and Dalton were both arrested in October 1924 and charged for the violation of the Mann Act in 1924. They were accused of crossing state lines for illicit fornication. Dalton claimed they were both innocent and the charges were eventually dropped.

Dalton married Hamilton on June 18, 1927, in Santa Ana, California. They were divorced on April 11, 1929.

Dalton died suddenly in 1934 at the age of 32. She was buried in Mount Carmel Cemetery in Hillside, Illinois.

Partial filmography
Three Jokers (1921)
Take Your Time (1921) 
Spooners (1921)
Children of Jazz (1923)
Bluebeard's 8th Wife (1923)

References

Lima, Ohio, Pair Held Under Mann Act, October 21, 1924, Page 3.
Los Angeles Times, Irene Dalton Is Freed, April 12, 1929, Page 24.
Los Angeles Times, Irene Dalton's Funeral Today'', August 18, 1934, Page 1.

External links

Picture gallery (University of Washington, Sayre collection)

1901 births
1934 deaths
American film actresses
American silent film actresses
20th-century American actresses